Edward Wallis Hoch (March 17, 1849 – June 1, 1925) was an American politician and the 17th Governor of Kansas. Hoch Auditoria at the University of Kansas was named after him.

Biography
Hoch was born in Danville, Kentucky. His education was in the public schools and he attended Central University in Danville. He left college before graduating, entered a newspaper office and spent three years learning to be a printer.

Hoch moved to Marion, Kansas, in 1871, and homesteaded 160 acres of land. He bought the Marion County Record newspaper in 1874 and became a country editor. He married Sarah Louise Dickerson on May 23, 1876, and they had four children, two sons and two daughters.

Career
Hoch was elected and served two terms in the Kansas House of Representatives (1889–91 and 1893–95).  He was elected governor in 1904 and reelected in 1906. During his tenure, many new laws were enacted, including a child labor law, a pure food law, a bank guaranty law, a party primary law, a maximum freight rate bill; and improvements were sanctioned in the juvenile courts and state institutions.

After leaving office, Hoch lectured on the Chautauqua circuit, becoming a well-known orator. He served on the Kansas Board of Administration from 1913 to 1919, and continued as publisher of the Marion Record until his death in Marion on June 1, 1925.

References

External links

  Kansas Newspaper Hall of Fame biography
 Marion County Record
 History of Early Marion County Newspapers, 1916
 Publications concerning Kansas Governor Hoch's administration available via the KGI Online Library

1849 births
1925 deaths
Politicians from Danville, Kentucky
Methodists from New Jersey
Republican Party governors of Kansas
Republican Party members of the Kansas House of Representatives
American publishers (people)
People from Marion, Kansas